The 1986 United States Senate election in Utah took place on November 4, 1986, concurrently with other elections to the United States Senate and United States House of Representatives as well as various state and local elections. Republican Jake Garn won re-election.

Major Candidates

Democratic
Craig S. Oliver, real estate agent

Republican
Jake Garn, incumbent Senator

Results

See also
1986 United States Senate elections

References

1986
United States Senate
Utah